Sawsan Amer سوسن عامر (born 1937, Cairo) is an Egyptian painter and art educator, considered as a pioneer Egyptian woman artist. She has been Director of the Art Research Unit at the Academy of the Arts and a professor on the faculty of Art Education at the College of Art Education.

Education and career 
Amer graduated from the College of Art Education, and has been Director of the Art Research Unit at the Academy of the Arts and a professor on the faculty of Art Education. She has authored a book and numerous articles on folk art, which has also inspired other artist's work. Furthermore, she was also noted for her paintings on glass and her collages, combining traditional iconography with personal imagery. Her work, inspired by traditional Arabic architecture, is known for its rich color sense.

Awards
 Cairo Salon, 1972
 Research Award from the Egyptian Committee on Public Art, 1991

Exhibitions
 Egyptian Cultural Center, Paris, 1978
 Egyptian Cultural Center, Paris, 1984
 Arab Artists, National Museum of Women in the Arts, Washington, 1994 
 Egyptian Contemporary Art exhibition, Beirut, 1995
 Egyptian Artists, Beijing, 1994-1995

References

External links
 Sawsan Amer (in Arabic)

Living people
20th-century Egyptian women artists
21st-century Egyptian women artists
Egyptian painters
Art educators
1937 births